Aínsa is the main town in the Aínsa-Sobrarbe municipal term, Aragon, Spain.

It is located south of the Pyrenees, in a geologically interesting setting at the north of Huesca. Besides the surrounding mountain landscape, the 12th-century Iglesia parroquial de Santa María church and the 11th-century castle are the main sights of the town. 

It is believed that there is a connection between the Ainsa and the Anza family surnames.

See also
 Kingdom of Sobrarbe

References

External links

 
 Aínsa Town Hall 
 Villa de Aínsa
 Ainsa city guide at HitchHikers Handbook

Aínsa-Sobrarbe

eu:Ainsa-Sobrarbe